Phloeomana speirea, commonly known as the bark bonnet, is a species of fungus in the family Porotheleaceae. It is a bark-inhabiting agaric  that produces fuscous-colored to whitish mycenoid to omphalinoid fruit bodies in temperate forests. The fungus was first described to science as Agaricus speireus by Elias Fries in 1815. Scott Redhead transferred it to the new genus Phloeomana in 2013, in which it is the type species.

References

External links

Porotheleaceae
Fungi described in 1815
Fungi of Europe
Fungi of North America